Evans Creek, a stream formerly a tributary of California Creek (Val Verde County, Texas) and Devils River it now flows into the western side of Amistad Reservoir at an elevation of 1119 feet.

See also
List of rivers of Texas

References

Rivers of Val Verde County, Texas
Tributaries of the Rio Grande